Julian is a census-designated place (CDP) in San Diego County, California. As of the 2020 census, the population was 1,768, up from 1,502 at the time of the 2010 census.

Julian is an official California Historical Landmark (No. 412). The Julian townsite and surrounding area is defined by the San Diego County Zoning Ordinance Section 5749 as the Julian Historic District. This designation requires that development adhere to certain guidelines that are administered by the Architectural Review Board of the Julian Historic District, which is appointed by the San Diego County Board of Supervisors.

The town is known for its apple pie and its annual Julian Apple Days Festival, which began in 1949.

History

19th century: Initial European settlement and the gold rush

The first European settlers to arrive in this area were "Cockney Bill" Williams from England and John Wesley Horrell, who both arrived in the area in 1850 or 1851. The town itself was first settled by Drury, Frank, and J.O. Bailey, all brothers; and their cousins, Mike and Webb Julian. They were passing through the region from San Bernardino en route to Arizona in 1869, in the wake of the American Civil War. Taken by the beauty of the Julian area, Drury Bailey interrupted the group’s travel plans and chose instead to settle here; he chose to name the settlement “Julian” after Mike Julian because “Mike was better looking” than any other member of the Bailey family. Julian was also a former Confederate soldier who was later elected San Diego County Assessor. Shortly afterwards gold was discovered in the Julian region. A tent city initially formed in the boomtown, followed by more permanent structures as it became apparent that gold mining in Julian would persist for some time. Victorian-style structures were constructed in the latest stage of Julian’s early settlement, including the Hoskins House.

After the American Civil War, in 1869, A.E. "Fred" Coleman, a former slave, crossed over what is now known as Coleman Creek just west of Julian. Seeing a glint of gold in the stream bed, he climbed down from his horse to investigate. Having had previous experience in the gold fields, he retrieved his frying pan and began panning the sands of the creek. Soon thereafter, Coleman established the Coleman Mining District and was its recorder and also began the mining camp called Emily City, later renamed Coleman City. Learning of the find, others rushed to the district and tried to trace the gold to its source. On February 22, 1870, the first "lode", or hard rock, mining claim was filed in the Julian area. Since February 22 was President George Washington's birthday, the mine was named the Washington mine. Soon hundreds of anxious men and families rushed to Julian to stake their claims. Julian experienced a gold rush and became a tent city overnight. In April 1870, the area's first sawmill was set up and Julian began to take on a more permanent structure. Attempts to build rival mining towns at Coleman City, Branson City and Eastwood were defeated. Owners of the Cuyamaca rancho Land Grant claimed (the Cuyamaca Land Float) Julian, and its mines were within the Rancho boundaries. In 1873, the courts ruled that the Rancho did not include Julian and the mines. While the miners tried to wrestle the gold from deep within the earth, James Madison brought a wagon load of young apple trees into the mountains. The fruit trees flourished in the clear, fresh air. Apples are still a big product in Julian, many of which are used for making the world-famous Julian apple pies. Local historians have variably suggested that the Julian of 1873 rivaled San Diego in population and they unsuccessfully attempted to shift the county seat to the city.

According to a bronze historical plaque appearing in the town, in the early days of Julian, the majority of San Diego County's Black population resided in or near the town, including the founders of the Robinson Hotel and a noted resident, America Newton, a freed slave who laundered miners' clothing. Of the 55 Black people living in San Diego County during the 1880 census, 33 lived in the Julian area.

20th century

In 1976, Julian approved a plan that required the exteriors of any buildings on Main Street be no younger in age than 1913. Many structures bear a Victorian architecture that predates this cutoff. In the 1970s, as many of 25,000 visitors visited the settlement per annum.

Julian had four or five wells in the 1970s. A county planner surveyed the water capacity for Julian and indicated that it was unlikely that Julian would ever have enough inexpensive water to sustain very large-scale development. During a period of drought, the community of Julian was compelled by the San Diego County supervisors to obey a moratorium on development until a 30,000 gallon waste treatment plant could reduce the risk that a developing Julian’s sewage output might pollute the San Diego River. Julian’s water supply became largely dependent on a single well owned by a local property owner named Jerry Zweig, as the community’s water board-owned resources were depleted in a drought in the 1990s and were severely limited by contamination as a defunct Chevron station contaminated three of the eight publicly owned water wells into the late 1980s.

On May 29, 1989, two individuals (Benjamin Haimes of Encino and Gustav Oran Hudson of El Cajon) disputed a claim to land to the Ready Relief and Hubbard Mines in Julian’s Chariot Canyon (historically owned by the Bureau of Land Management) over rights to an area where both had intentions to prospect for gold. Hudson and his family arrived at the property at a time when Haimes’ appointed caretaker (Chris Zerbe) and the caretaker’s friend (Joe Lopes) of Julian. The resulting escalation involved the replacement of a padlock at the Hubbard Mine by the Hudsons, conflicting accounts of alcohol use and escalative behavior by Zerbe, and a shootout in which Zerbe and Lopes (who did not fire) were ultimately killed. No charges were filed. Nicknamed the “Chariot Canyon Massacre,” these killings are understood to be the first gold prospecting-related killing in Julian since the gold rush of the late 1800s.

A controversy erupted in Julian in 1991 as the community finally lost its bid to resist the construction of fast food restaurants. Dairy Queen and Subway were the first to relocate into the town during this time. Zweig circumvented a community moratorium on new development (induced due to the town’s longstanding drought), agreeing to continue to sell 30,000 gallons of water a day in return for the waiver to build. Zweig, also the owner of the largest well in the community, also allegedly threatened to cut off the community’s water supply unless they acquiesced. Neither business was supported by the community and both have since closed.

21st century

The region around Julian was hit by a multi-year drought starting in 1999, leading up and into the catastrophic Cedar Fire of 2003 following an extremely wet 1997–1998 El Niño cycle. This has also been controversially attributed to stressors from the development of weekend and holiday housing in the town by outsiders. Drought conditions were noted to have allowed the rise of beetle pests to consume Coulter pines in and around the community, as the pines do not have access to enough water to protect their trunks with sap. The drought-induced devastation of the Coulter pines due to the beetles has allowed some landowners in the Volcan Mountains to the immediate north of Julian to obtain exemptions from filing timber-harvest plans. These plans are normally required under the California Environmental Quality Act and effectively allow the state to regulate the logging practices exercised on a parcel of land, raising fears in Julian that overlogging might be technically permissible in light of the Coulter pine disaster.

In recent decades Julian has become a quaint mountain resort, with most businesses oriented toward tourism and not local services. The main area of town narrowly escaped destruction in the 2003 Cedar Fire that burned much of the surrounding area.

In 2004, an interviewing journalist noted that up to a third of Julian’s population had been affected by property losses associated with fire. The local fire district had recently removed property-tax benefit fees, making reconstruction more difficult for residents devastated by fires. Drought and infestation of the local forests by pine bark beetles was observed to exacerbate the fire season’s stressing effect on the community.

Fire disruptions as of 2004 were observed in Julian to have caused the disappearance of populations of red-winged blackbirds, acorn woodpeckers, white-crowned sparrows, lesser goldfinches, scrub jays, Steller’s jays, nuthatches, or black-headed grosbeaks.

Luxury home developments have expanded the community of Julian into the early 2010s. Luxury homes in these developments (such as the New England-themed Hoskings Ranch development), which often exceed $1 million in listing prices, are predominantly owned as vacation homes by individuals who principally live in La Jolla, with significant concentrations from Del Mar and Coronado in metropolitan San Diego. In 2017, the Julian Arts Guild opened an art gallery in downtown Julian, Julian Arts Guild Gallery, where local artists and artisans display their works.

Geography

Soils in and around Julian are mostly dark brown, slightly to moderately acidic sandy loams which are well drained and of variable stoniness. Less stony areas, which underlie most of the townsite, are in the Holland series. The hills around town have rocky soils of the Crouch series. Somewhat poorly drained alluvial loam occurs along Coleman Creek.

Climate
Julian experiences more extreme temperatures and greater precipitation than much of southern California. It also receives snow annually, which accumulates the most in February and March. This attracts people from San Diego and other coastal cities, where snow is a once-in-a-lifetime event. As is typical in southern California, the summer has the driest months, but with a number of monsoonal storms from the southeast. Average yearly snowfall from 1991 to 2020 has been .

Demographics

2010
The 2010 United States Census reported that Julian had a population of 1,502. The racial makeup of Julian was 1,341 (89.3%) White, 5 (0.3%) African American, 27 (1.8%) Native American, 12 (0.8%) Asian, 0 (0.0%) Pacific Islander, 81 (5.4%) from other races, and 36 (2.4%) from two or more races. Hispanic or Latino of any race were 195 persons (13.0%).

The Census reported that 1,502 people (100% of the population) lived in households, zero (0%) lived in non-institutionalized group quarters, and 0 (0%) were institutionalized.

There were 670 households, out of which 146 (21.8%) had children under the age of 18 living in them, 329 (49.1%) were opposite-sex married couples living together, 51 (7.6%) had a female householder with no husband present, 35 (5.2%) had a male householder with no wife present. There were 41 (6.1%) unmarried opposite-sex partnerships, and 4 (0.6%) same-sex married couples or partnerships. 209 households (31.2%) were made up of individuals, and 89 (13.3%) had someone living alone who was 65 years of age or older. The average household size was 2.24. There were 415 families (61.9% of all households); the average family size was 2.80.

The population was spread out, with 283 people (18.8%) under the age of 18, 76 people (5.1%) aged 18 to 24, 260 people (17.3%) aged 25 to 44, 585 people (38.9%) aged 45 to 64, and 298 people (19.8%) who were 65 years of age or older. The median age was 50.8 years. For every 100 females, 96.1 were males. For every 100 females age 18 and over, 95.4 were males.

The homeowner vacancy rate was 3.0%; the rental vacancy rate was 9.5%. 1,065 people (70.9% of the population) lived in owner-occupied housing units and 437 people (29.1%) lived in rental housing units.

2000
As of the census of 2000, there were 1,621 people, 658 households, and 459 families residing in the CDP. The population density was 204.8 inhabitants per square mile (79.0/km). The racial makeup of the CDP was 91.05% White, 1.17% Native American, 0.74% African American, 0.49% Asian, 0.12% Pacific Islander, 3.95% from other races, and 2.47% from two or more races. Hispanic or Latino of any race were 8.08% of the population.

There were 658 households, out of which 31.9% had children under the age of 18 living with them, 56.2% were married couples living together, 10.2% had a female householder with no husband present, and 30.2% were non-families. 24.3% of all households were made up of individuals, and 7.6% had someone living alone who was 65 years of age or older. The average household size was 2.46 and the average family size was 2.93.

In the CDP, the population was spread out, with 25.8% under the age of 18, 5.2% from 18 to 24, 22.6% from 25 to 44, 32.9% from 45 to 64, and 13.4% who were 65 years of age or older. The median age was 43 years. For every 100 females, there were 99.4 males. For every 100 females age 18 and over, there were 95.3 males.

The median income for a household in the CDP was $44,681, and the median income for a family was $49,143. Males had a median income of $32,105 versus $26,509 for females. The per capita income for the CDP was $18,132. About 4.3% of families and 6.6% of the population were below the poverty line, including 12.9% of those under age 18 and none of those age 65 or over.

Culture

Arts and entertainment

 Galloping On and Satan's Blade were filmed on location in Julian.
 Principal photography for Phantasm took place at an ice cream parlor on Main Street in Julian.
 Scenes in Carving a Life accentuated several landmarks in Julian and included residents local to the area.
 The 2019 film Beneath the Leaves is set in Julian.
 Several locations in Julian were utilized for the 2020 film Sweet Taste of Souls.

Notable people 
John Baca, decorated Vietnam War veteran and activist for homeless veterans
Eleanor Burns, quilt maker, author, star of public television show
A. E. Coleman, former slave who discovered gold in Julian
James Hubbell, artist, architect, sculptor, and founder of the Ilan-Lael Foundation
Don Kojis, former record-breaking, All-Star professional basketball player
America Newton, former slave who helped launch the mining town
Sig Ruman, German-American actor known for playing villains
Cathy Scott, Los Angeles Times bestselling true-crime author; journalist
Don Weeke, fiber and gourd artist
Don Winslow, screenwriter and New York Times bestselling novelist

Economy
The main employment sectors in Julian are tourism and agriculture, with emphasis on apples.  Julian is on the Pacific Crest Trail.

Government

Education
The Julian Union School District operates one elementary, one junior high, one high school, and one Julian Charter School.

Infrastructure

Transportation
Access to Julian is limited to three major roads. The northern access is via State Route 79, which ultimately links to various other roads and highways serving northern San Diego and southwestern Riverside counties, including Interstate 15. State Route 78 comes to Julian from the west, providing access to Ramona and Escondido. The eastern access is State Route 78, which descends the eastern slope of the mountains to intersect with State Route 86 in Imperial County; this is the least commonly used of the three routes. The southern access is State Route 79 through Cuyamaca Rancho State Park, which provides a link to Interstate 8.

Attractions

The California Wolf Center (CWC) lies  outside of Julian, and is the principal captive breeding facility for the endangered Mexican wolf (which, as of 2012, had fewer than 50 wild members of its species). Alaskan wolves have also been raised and studied at the facility. The California Wolf Center is managed in conjunction with the United States Forest Service but is financed entirely through private donations.

References

External links
 

 Julian Chamber of Commerce

Census-designated places in San Diego County, California
Cuyamaca Mountains
East County (San Diego County)
California Historical Landmarks
Census-designated places in California